The Sale of Offices Act 1551 (5 & 6 Edw 6 c 16) is an Act of the Parliament of England. The Act is concerned with corruption in public office. It has been repealed completely in the United Kingdom since 2013, but only partly in the Republic of Ireland, where it makes it an offence to sell certain public offices, or to receive or agree to receive money for an office.

The Sale of Offices Act 1551 was extended to Scotland and Ireland, and to all offices in the gift of the Crown, by section 1 of the Sale of Offices Act 1809, now also repealed in the UK. The two Acts had to be construed as one.

The Sale of Offices Act 1551 was repealed, from and after 5 July 1826, so far as regards the Revenue of Customs or Offices in the Service of the Customs,  by sections 1 and 10 of the Act 6 Geo 4 c 105.

The whole Act was repealed in the UK by section 1 of, and Group 7 of Part 2 of Schedule 1 to, the Statute Law (Repeals) Act 2013.

Parts of this Act were retained for the Republic of Ireland by section 2(2)(a) of, and Part 2 of Schedule 1 to, the Statute Law Revision Act 2007.

See Graeme v Wroughton (1855) 11 Exch 146, (1855) 24 LJ Ex 265.

Provisions

Section 2
This section, from "be it also" to "aforesaide", was repealed by section 1(1) of, and Part I of the Schedule to, the Statute Law Revision Act 1888.

Section 3
This section was repealed by section 1 of, and Schedule 1 to the Statute Law Revision Act 1948.

This section was repealed for the Republic of Ireland by section 1 of, and Part III of the Schedule to, the Statute Law Revision Act 1983.

Section 5
This section was repealed for England and Wales by section 1 of, and the Schedule to, the Statute Law Revision Act 1863. This section, in so far as it extended to Northern Ireland, was repealed by section 1(1) of, and Schedule 1 to, the Statute Law Revision Act 1950.

This section was repealed for the Republic of Ireland by section 1 of, and Part III of the Schedule to, the Statute Law Revision Act 1983.

Section 6
This section was repealed for England and Wales by section 1 of, and the Schedule to, the Statute Law Revision Act 1863. This section, in so far as it extended to Northern Ireland, was repealed by section 1(1) of, and Schedule 1 to, the Statute Law Revision Act 1950.

This section was repealed for the Republic of Ireland by section 1 of, and Part III of the Schedule to, the Statute Law Revision Act 1983.

See also
Political corruption

References

External links
The Sale of Offices Act 1551, as amended, from Legislation.gov.uk.
List of amendments and repeals in the Republic of Ireland from the Irish Statute Book.

Acts of the Parliament of England (1485–1603)
1551 in law
1551 in England